Prickly Paradigm Press is a new incarnation of Prickly Pear Pamphlets, which was started in 1993, in Cambridge, England, by anthropologists Keith Hart and Anna Grimshaw. Together they published a series of ten pamphlets on a range of topics in anthropology, the history of science, and ethnographic film. In 1998, Mark Harris and Matthew Engelke took over the press, expanding its operations in the world market and adding a select few titles to its list. In 2001, Marshall Sahlins took over the press, renamed it Prickly Paradigm, and re-published his own pamphlet (Waiting for Foucault) and also Richard Rorty's. In 2004, Justin Shaffner scanned the original Prickly Pear pamphlets into a PDF format and made them freely available for distribution on the Internet.

See also
 Anthropology
 List of anthropologists
 Small press
 List of small presses

References

Further reading 

 https://web.archive.org/web/20061119163651/http://www.prickly-paradigm.com/review.htm
 https://creativecommons.org/2005/10/01/sahlins/

External links
 Prickly Paradigm Press
 Prickly Pear Pamphlets

Anthropology organizations
Publishing companies of the United States
Small press publishing companies
University of Chicago
Publishing companies established in 1993